The 1944 Kansas gubernatorial election was held on November 7, 1944. Incumbent Republican Andrew Frank Schoeppel defeated Democratic nominee Robert S. Lemon with 65.73% of the vote.

General election

Candidates
Major party candidates 
Andrew Frank Schoeppel, Republican
Robert S. Lemon, Democratic

Other candidates
David C. White, Prohibition
W. W. Tamplin, Socialist

Results

References

1944
Kansas
Gubernatorial